Arkansas Highway 37 is a designation for two state highways in Arkansas. The main segment of  runs from McCrory to Cord. A short segment of  runs north in Benton County from U.S. Route 62 to the Missouri state line.

Route description

McCrory to Cord
AR 37 begins north of McCrory at AR 17 and runs north to AR 145 near Beedeville and AR 14 in Amagon. The route passes near the Cache River National Wildlife Refuge. The route continues north to AR 18 in Grubbs and US 67 (Future I-57) in Tuckerman. AR 37 also passes the historic Tuckerman Water Tower in Tuckerman. Arkansas Highway 37 continues northwest to Cord, where the route meets AR 122 and terminates.

Gateway to Missouri
The only town on the route, Gateway, is also the southern terminus (at US 62).  The northern terminus is at the Missouri state line where the road continues as Route 37.

Major intersections
Mile markers reset at concurrencies.

History

Arkansas Highway 37 was first formed in the original 1926 state highway plan as a route from AR 17 near McCrory north to AR 18 near Grubbs. By 1940, the route had been extended north to Tuckerman, existing as a gravel road, and in some portions, an unimproved dirt road. By 1945, the routing was extended to Cord. The highway's routing has remained essentially unchanged since this extension, though the route is now paved.

Highway 47 was the former designation for U.S. Highway 62 between Rogers and Gateway and Highway 37 between Gateway and the Missouri State Line. When U.S. 62 was designated in Arkansas in 1930, Highway 47 was truncated to the  segment from Gateway to the Missouri state line where it continued as Route 37. The brief connector segment was renumbered in January 1976 to match the Missouri designation, thus providing continuity for travelers seeking Eureka Springs.

See also

References

External links

037
Transportation in Benton County, Arkansas
Transportation in Independence County, Arkansas
Transportation in Jackson County, Arkansas
Transportation in Woodruff County, Arkansas